Don C. Peden (December 30, 1898 – February 23, 1970) was an American football and baseball player and coach. He served as the head football coach at Ohio University from 1924 to 1946, compiling a record of 121 wins, 46 losses and 11 draws Peden's winning percentage of (.711) is the highest of any coach in the history of the Ohio Bobcats football program. His teams won six Buckeye Athletic Association championships, in 1929, 1930, 1931, 1935, 1936, and 1938.

Peden was also the head baseball coach at Ohio from 1924 to 1948, tallying a mark of 250–134 and served as the university's Athletic Director from 1938 to 1949.

The Bobcats' football stadium was renamed in his honor as Peden Stadium following his retirement. Peden died at the age of 71 on February 23, 1970, in San Diego, California.

Head coaching record

Football

References

External links
 

Year of birth uncertain
1898 births
1970 deaths
American football halfbacks
Cincinnati Reds scouts
Illinois Fighting Illini baseball players
Illinois Fighting Illini football players
Ohio Bobcats athletic directors
Ohio Bobcats baseball coaches
Ohio Bobcats football coaches
People from Kewanee, Illinois